John Feinblatt (born May 22, 1951) is an American criminal justice expert and the president of Everytown for Gun Safety, the largest gun violence prevention organization in the United States.

Feinblatt is also a senior advisor to former New York City Mayor Michael Bloomberg, and was responsible for leading the mayor's national coalitions on guns, immigration reform, infrastructure investment and marriage equality.

Education 
Feinblatt was born in Baltimore, Maryland and graduated from Wesleyan University in 1973.  He received his Juris Doctor degree from the Catholic University of America.

Career 
Feinblatt's career in criminal justice began as a research associate at the Vera Institute of Justice. He then worked as a public defender with The Legal Aid Society in New York City before moving to Victims Services (now Safe Horizons), where he rose to Deputy Executive Director.
 
In the early 1990s, Feinblatt founded the Midtown Community Court.

In partnership with Judith Kaye, who was then Chief Judge of New York State, Feinblatt went on to found the Center for Court Innovation, a public-private partnership that supported the creation of additional problem-solving courts focused on domestic violence, substance abuse, and mental health that were widely replicated in New York and across the country.

In 2002, the then newly-elected Mayor Michael Bloomberg tapped Feinblatt to serve as the criminal justice coordinator for the City of New York. In this role, he served as Mayor Bloomberg's chief advisor on criminal justice policy and liaison to the state court system, the city's five elected district attorneys and the state criminal justice system.

In 2006, Bloomberg and Feinblatt turned their attention to the gun violence crisis and its effect on cities across the United States. Together with then-Boston Mayor Thomas Menino, they founded Mayors Against Illegal Guns with an original coalition of 15 mayors. Feinblatt was appointed Bloomberg's chief advisor for policy and strategic planning in February 2010.
  
In 2014, Mayors Against Illegal Guns and Moms Demand Action for Gun Sense in America, a grassroots gun violence prevention movement started by Shannon Watts, joined forces to become Everytown for Gun Safety. Feinblatt became the organization's president, and still serves in that role today.

Writing 
In 2005, Feinblatt co-authored Good Courts: The Case for Problem-Solving Justice

See also 
 Everytown for Gun Safety
 Center for Court Innovation

References

External links
 Everytown for Gun Safety website
 Center for Court Innovation website

Living people
1951 births
Criminal defense lawyers

Year of birth missing (living people)